Nuclear magnetic resonance (NMR) in porous materials covers the application of using NMR as a tool to study the structure of porous media and various processes occurring in them. This technique allows the determination of characteristics such as the porosity and pore size distribution, the permeability, the water saturation, the wettability, etc.

Theory of relaxation time distribution in porous media

Microscopically the volume of a single pore in a porous media may be divided into two regions; surface area  and bulk volume  (Figure 1).

The surface area is a thin layer with thickness  of a few molecules close to the pore wall surface. The bulk volume is the remaining part of the pore volume and usually dominates the overall pore volume. With respect to NMR excitations of nuclear states for hydrogen-containing molecules in these regions, different relaxation times for the induced excited energy states are expected. The relaxation time is significantly shorter for a molecule in the surface area, compared to a molecule in the bulk volume. This is an effect of paramagnetic centres in the pore wall surface that causes the relaxation time to be faster.
The inverse of the relaxation time , is expressed by contributions from the bulk volume , the surface area  and the self-diffusion :
 with 
The surface relaxation can be assumed as uniform or non-uniform.

The NMR signal intensity in the  distribution plot reflected by the measured amplitude of the NMR signal is proportional to the total amount of hydrogen nuclei, while the relaxation time depends on the interaction between the nuclear spins and the surroundings. In a characteristic pore containing for an example, water, the bulk water exhibits a single exponential decay. The water close to the pore wall surface exhibits faster  relaxation time for this characteristic pore size.

NMR permeability correlations

NMR techniques are typically used to predict permeability for fluid typing and to obtain formation porosity, which is independent of mineralogy. The former application uses a surface-relaxation mechanism to relate
measured relaxation spectra with surface-to-volume ratios of pores, and the latter is used to estimate permeability. The common approach is based on the model proposed by Brownstein and Tarr. They have shown that, in the fast diffusion limit, given by the expression:

The connection between NMR relaxation measurements and petrophysical parameters such as permeability stems from the strong effect that the rock surface has on promoting magnetic relaxation. For a single pore, the magnetic decay as a function of time is described by a single exponential:

where  is the initial magnetization and the transverse relaxation time  is given by:

For small pores or large , the bulk relaxation time is small and the equation can be approximated by: 

Real rocks contain an assembly of interconnected pores of different sizes. The pores are connected through small and narrow pore throats (i.e. links) that restrict interpore diffusion. If interpore diffusion is negligible, each pore can be considered to be distinct and the magnetization within individual pores decays independently of the magnetization in neighbouring pores. The decay can thus be described as:

where  is the volume fraction of pores of size  that decays with relaxation time . Due to the pore size variations, a non-linear optimization algorithm with multi-exponential terms is used to fit experimental data. Usually, a weighted geometric mean, of the relaxation times is used for permeability correlations:

 is thus related to an average  or pore size. Commonly used NMR permeability correlations as proposed by Dunn et al. are of the form:

where  is the porosity of the rock. Correlations of this form can be rationalized from the Kozeny–Carman equation:

However, it is well known that tortuosity is not only a function of porosity. It also depends on the formation factor . The formation factor can be obtained from resistivity logs and is usually readily available. This has given rise to permeability correlations of the form:

Intuitively, correlations of this form are a better model since it incorporates tortuosity information through .

The value of the surface relaxation strength  affects strongly the NMR signal decay rate and hence the estimated permeability. Surface relaxivity data are difficult to measure, and most NMR permeability correlations assume a constant . However, for heterogeneous reservoir rocks with different mineralogy,  is certainly not constant and surface relaxivity has been reported to increase with higher fractions of microporosity. If surface relaxivity data are available it can be included in the NMR permeability correlation as

relaxation

For fully brine saturated porous media, three different mechanisms contribute to the relaxation: bulk fluid relaxation, surface relaxation, and relaxation due to gradients in the magnetic field. In the absence of magnetic field gradients, the equations describing the relaxation are:

  on S

with the initial condition

 and 

where  is the self-diffusion coefficient. The governing diffusion equation can be solved by a 3D random walk algorithm. Initially, the walkers are launched at random positions in the pore space. At each time step, they advance from their current position, to a new position, by taking steps of fixed length  in a randomly chosen direction. The time step is given by:

The new position is given by

The angles   and  represent the randomly selected direction for each random walker in spherical coordinates. It can be noted that  must be distributed uniformly in the range (0,). If a walker encounters a pore-solid interface, it is killed with a finite probability . The killing probability  is related to the surface relaxation strength by:

If the walker survives, it simply bounces off the interface and its position does not change. At each time step, the fraction  of the initial walkers that are still alive is recorded. Since the walkers move with equal probability in all directions, the above algorithm is valid as long as there is no magnetic gradient in the system.

When protons are diffusing, the sequence of spin echo amplitudes is affected by inhomogeneities in the permanent magnetic field. This results in an additional decay of the spin echo amplitudes that depends on the echo spacing . In the simple case of a uniform spatial gradient , the additional decay can be expressed as a multiplicative factor:

where  is the ratio of the Larmor frequency to the magnetic field intensity. The total magnetization amplitude as a function of time is then given as:

NMR as a tool to measure wettability

The wettability conditions in a porous media containing two or more immiscible fluid phases determine the microscopic fluid distribution in the pore network. Nuclear magnetic resonance measurements are sensitive to wettability because of the strong effect that the solid surface has on promoting magnetic relaxation of the saturating fluid. The idea of using NMR as a tool to measure wettability was presented by Brown and Fatt in 1956. The magnitude of this effect depends upon the wettability characteristics of the solid with respect to the liquid in contact with the surface. Their theory is based on the hypothesis that molecular movements are slower in the bulk liquid than at the solid-liquid interface. In this solid-liquid interface the diffusion coefficient is reduced, which correspond to a zone of higher viscosity. In this higher viscosity zone, the magnetically aligned protons can more easily transfer their energy to their surroundings. The magnitude of this effect depends upon the wettability characteristics of the solid with respect to the liquid in contact with the surface.

NMR Cryoporometry for measuring pore size distributions

NMR Cryoporometry (NMRC) is a recent technique for measuring total porosity and pore size distributions. It makes use of the Gibbs-Thomson effect : small crystals of a liquid in the pores melt at a lower temperature than the bulk liquid : The melting point depression is inversely proportional to the pore size. The technique is closely related to that of the use of gas adsorption to measure pore sizes (Kelvin equation). Both techniques are particular cases of the Gibbs Equations (Josiah Willard Gibbs): the Kelvin Equation is the constant temperature case, and the Gibbs-Thomson Equation is the constant pressure case. 

To make a Cryoporometry measurement, a liquid is imbibed into the porous sample, the sample cooled until all the liquid is frozen, and then warmed slowly while measuring the quantity of the liquid that has melted. Thus it is similar to DSC thermoporosimetry, but has higher resolution, as the signal detection does not rely on transient heat flows, and the measurement can be made arbitrarily slowly.  It is suitable for measuring pore diameters in the range 2 nm–2 μm.
 
Nuclear Magnetic Resonance (NMR) may be used as a convenient method of measuring the quantity of liquid that has melted, as a function of temperature, making use of the fact that the  relaxation time in a frozen material is usually much shorter than that in a mobile liquid. The technique was developed at the University of Kent in the UK.
 It is also possible to adapt the basic NMRC experiment to provide structural resolution in spatially dependent pore size distributions, or to provide behavioural information about the confined liquid.

See also
 Earth's field NMR (EFNMR)
 Low field NMR
 NMR
 NMR spectroscopy

References

Nuclear magnetic resonance
Porous media